DOPE, short for Dartmouth Oversimplified Programming Experiment, was a simple programming language designed by John Kemény in 1962 to offer students a transition from flow-charting to programming the LGP-30. Lessons learned from implementing DOPE were subsequently applied to the invention and development of BASIC.

Description
Each statement was designed to correspond to a flowchart operation and consisted of a numeric line number, an operation, and the required operands:
  7 + A B C
 10 SIN X Z

The final variable specified the destination for the computation. The above program corresponds in functionality to the later BASIC program:

DOPE might be the first programming language to require every statement to have a line number, predating JOSS and BASIC.

The language was case insensitive.

Variable names were a single letter A to Z, or a letter followed by a digit (A0 to Z9). As with Fortran, different letters represented different variable types. Variables starting with letters A to D were floating point, as were variables from I to Z; variables E, F, G, and H each were defined as vectors with components from 1 to 16.

The language was used by only one freshman computing class. Kemeny collaborated with high school student Sidney Marshall (taking freshman calculus) to develop the language.

Legacy
According to Thomas Kurtz, a co-inventor of BASIC, "Though not a success in itself, DOPE presaged BASIC. DOPE provided default vectors, default printing formats, and general input formats. Line numbers doubled as jump targets."

The language had a number of other features and innovations that were carried over into BASIC:
 Variable names were either a letter or a letter followed by a digit
 Arrays (vectors) did not have to be declared and had a default size (16 instead of 10)
 Every line required a numeric label*
 Lines were sorted in numeric order*
 Every line begin with a keyword*
 Function names were three letters long*
 The only loop construct was a for-loop
Unlike either Fortran or Algol 60.

See also
 DARSIMCO, 'Dartmouth Simplified Code', a 1956 assembler macro language
 Dartmouth ALGOL 30, a compiler developed by Dartmouth for the LGP-30

References

Programming languages